Sékou Mara (born 30 July 2002) is a French professional footballer who plays as a forward for Premier League club Southampton.

Club career

Bordeaux 
Mara made his professional debut for Bordeaux in a 2–0 Coupe de France loss to Toulouse on 10 February 2021. He scored his first professional goal in a 1–0 Ligue 1 win over Rennes on 2 May 2021. By scoring this goal, he became the youngest player to score a league goal for Bordeaux in almost 14 years.

Southampton 
On 21 July 2022, it was confirmed by Bordeaux that they had accepted an offer from Southampton for Mara, and that the deal was subject to a medical. On 25 July 2022, Southampton confirmed that Mara had signed a four-year deal with the club. On 13 August 2022, Mara made his first Premier League appearance in Southampton’s 2–2 draw with Leeds United after he replaced Jan Bednarek. On 11 January 2023, Mara scored his first goal for the club in a 2–0 quarter final EFL Cup victory against Manchester City.

International career 
Mara is a youth international for France. He has played matches at under-16, under-17, under-20, and under-21 level.

Personal life 
Born in France, Mara is of French and Senegalese descent. His mother, Audrey Crespo-Mara, is a French journalist and television presenter, and his father, Aliou Mara, is a Senegalese entrepreneur.

Career statistics

Honours
Individual
Maurice Revello Tournament Golden Boot: 2022
Maurice Revello Tournament Silver Ball: 2022
Maurice Revello Tournament Best XI: 2022

References

External links 
 France profile at FFF
 
 
 

2002 births
Living people
Footballers from Paris
French sportspeople of Senegalese descent
Black French sportspeople
French footballers
Association football forwards
France youth international footballers
Paris Saint-Germain F.C. players
AC Boulogne-Billancourt players
FC Girondins de Bordeaux players
Southampton F.C. players
Championnat National 3 players
Ligue 1 players
Premier League players